Dau is a surname. Notable people with the surname include:

Association footballers
Chok Dau (born 1998), South Sudanese footballer, plays for Perth RedStar and South Sudan
Đậu Văn Toàn (born 1997), Vietnamese footballer, plays for Hà Nội
Ratu Dau (born 2000), Fijian footballer, plays for Ba and Fiji
Thomas Dau (born 1991), Austrian footballer, has played for various Austrian clubs

Others
Carl Dau (born 1942), German designer
Heinrich Dau (1790–1831), Holstein-Danish geologist and writer
John Dau (born 1974), American/Sudanese activist, one of the Lost Boys of Sudan
Ramiro Lopez Dau, film director and animator
Stephen Dau (born 1971), American-Belgian writer
Stephen Dhieu Dau, South Sudanese politician

See also
Daus (surname)